Dixon is an unincorporated community in Allen County, Indiana and Van Wert County, Ohio.

History
Dixon was laid out around 1854. A post office was established on the town's Ohio side in 1855, where it was in operation until 1958.

References

Unincorporated communities in Allen County, Indiana
Unincorporated communities in Van Wert County, Ohio
Unincorporated communities in Indiana
Unincorporated communities in Ohio
1854 establishments in Ohio
Populated places established in 1854